Polina Rahimova (born 5 June 1990) is an Uzbekistani-born Azerbaijani indoor volleyball player that plays for Brazilian club SESI/Vôlei Bauru  and Azerbaijan women's national volleyball team.

In December 2015, during her time in Japan, Rahimova achieved 58 points in a single match, setting a world record.

Awards

Individuals
 2008-09 Novotel Cup "Best Scorer"
 2008-09 Novotel Cup "Most Valuable Player"
 2008-09 Dubai Volley Tournament "Best Blocker"
 2009-10 Azerbaijan Superleague "Best Scorer"
 2009-10 Azerbaijan Cup "Best Scorer"
 2010 World Championship qualification "Best Server and Best Spiker"
 2010-11 Azerbaijan Superleague "Best Scorer and Best Server"
 2011-12 Azerbaijan Superleague "Best Server"
 2014-15 V-League "Best Scorer, Best Server and Best Spiker"
 2016 European League "Most Valuable Player"
 2022  Vietnam Volleyball Championship "Best Spiker"

Clubs
 2005–06 Azerbaijan Superleague -  Bronze medal, with Nagliyatchi VC
 2007–08 Azerbaijan Superleague -  Champion, with Azerrail Baku
 2008–09 Azerbaijan Superleague -  Runner-Up, with Azerrail Baku
 2008-09 Novotel Cup -  Champion, with Azerrail Baku
 2008-09 Dubai Volley Tournament -  Runner-Up, with Azerrail Baku
 2009–10 Azerbaijan Cup -  Champion, with Azerrail Baku
 2010–11 Azerbaijan Superleague-  Runner-Up, with Azerrail Baku
 2010–11 Challenge Cup -  Champion, with Azerrail Baku
 2012-13 Azerbaijan Superleague -  Bronze medal, with Azerrail Baku
 2013-14 Azerbaijan Superleague -  Runner-Up, with Azeryol Baku
 2014–15 V-League -  Bronze medal, with Suwon Hyundai E&C
 2022 Volleyball Vietnam League -  Champion, with Geleximco Thai Binh

National
 2016 European League -  Champion, with Azerbaijan
 2017 Islamic Solidarity Games -  Champion, with Azerbaijan

References

External links
 

1990 births
Living people
People from Fergana
Uzbekistani women's volleyball players
Azerbaijani women's volleyball players
Uzbekistani emigrants to Azerbaijan
Naturalized citizens of Azerbaijan
Azerbaijani expatriate sportspeople in Japan
Expatriate volleyball players in Japan
Expatriate volleyball players in South Korea
Expatriate volleyball players in Turkey
European Games competitors for Azerbaijan
Volleyball players at the 2015 European Games
Fenerbahçe volleyballers
Opposite hitters
Expatriate volleyball players in Italy
Azerbaijani expatriate sportspeople in Turkey
Azerbaijani expatriate sportspeople in Italy
Azerbaijani expatriate sportspeople in South Korea
Azerbaijani expatriate sportspeople in Vietnam
Expatriate volleyball players in Vietnam
Azerbaijani expatriate sportspeople in Brazil
Expatriate volleyball players in Brazil